Photinus curtatus is a species of firefly in the family Lampyridae. It is found in North America.

References

Further reading

 
 
 
 
 

Lampyridae
Bioluminescent insects